Mount Kerr may refer to:

 Mount Kerr (Alberta) in Alberta, Canada
 Mount Kerr (Antarctica)
 Mount Kerr (British Columbia) in British Columbia, Canada